Means is a surname. Notable people with the surname include:

 Amanda Means (b. 1945), American artist
 Carey Means (b. 1966), American voice actor
 David Means (b. 1961), American writer
 Eldred Kurtz Means (March 11, 1878 - February 19, 1957) was a white Methodist Episcopal clergyman and famed public speaker and author.
 Gardiner Means (1896–1988), American economist
 Gaston Means (1879–1938), American private detective, bootlegger, and con artist
 Jimmy Means (b. 1950), American race car driver and owner
 John Means (disambiguation)
 Marianne Means (1934–2017), American political journalist
 Natrone Means (b. 1972), American football player
 Philip Ainsworth Means (1892–1944), American born anthropologist and historian
 Rice W. Means (1877–1949), Republican United States Senator from Colorado
 Russell Means (1939–2012), American activist
 Samuel C. Means (1828-1891) Virginian partisan in the American Civil War and lead the Loudoun Rangers
 Tim Means (environmentalist) (1944–2019), American Mexican Environmentalist

See also 
 Means (disambiguation)